The Albany Law Review is a quarterly law review edited by students at Albany Law School. The Albany Law Review is one of three student-edited law journals published by the school.

History 

The Albany Law Review was founded in 1936. Its founding followed the publication of the Albany Law School Journal, the first student-edited legal periodical in the United States. The Albany Law Review considers itself to be the Albany Law School Journal's successor publication. The only verified surviving copy of the Albany Law School Journal hangs in the office of the editor-in-chief of the Albany Law Review.

The Albany Law Review has historically published four issues annually. For most of its history, the issues were of no particular topical focus or were topically linked to a symposium held at the law school. In 1996, the Albany Law Review absorbed the Rutgers publication State Constitutional Commentary and Notes, dedicating one of its four annual issues, titled State Constitutional Commentary, to scholarship related to state constitutional law. In 2010, the journal dedicated a second issue, titled New York Appeals, to the study of appellate courts in New York state. The following year, a third issue, titled Miscarriages of Justice, was dedicated to exploring failures in the criminal justice system. That issue is created in partnership with the State University of New York at Albany's School of Criminal Justice.

In addition, the journal has also sponsored a series of symposia, bringing noted speakers on contemporary legal topics to the law school. These speakers range from politicians, to legal academics, to sitting members of the judiciary. In recent years, the Albany Law Review has held two symposia, one in each semester of the academic year.

Membership 

The members of the Albany Law Review are all students at Albany Law School. As with many law reviews, attaining membership on the Albany Law Review is a competitive process. Students become eligible for journal membership upon completion of their first year of law school. Offers of membership are extended based on student class standing or on the results of a writing competition jointly administered by the school's three student-edited journals. Members are given editorial and research related assignments in their second year of law school, and are required to produce an article of publishable quality. In their third year, members may be elected to the Editorial Board, which handles the overall production and publication of the journal.

The faculty advisor of the Albany Law Review is Vincent Martin Bonventre.

Notable symposia 

 The New York Court of Appeals: The Untold Secrets of Eagle Street (March 21, 2013) 
 Panelists: New York Chief Judge Jonathan Lippman; Associate Judges Robert S. Smith, Victoria A. Graffeo, Susan Phillips Read, Eugene F. Pigott, Jr., and Jenny Rivera.

 What Are We Saying: Violence, Vulgarity, Lies . . . and the Importance of 21st Century Free Speech (September 27, 2012)
 Moderators: Adam Liptak and Ronald K.L. Collins
 Panelists: Floyd Abrams, Alan Morrison (lawyer), Susan N. Herman, Robert M. O'Neil, and Robert D. Richards
 The State of State Courts (March 8, 2012)
 Moderator: New York Chief Judge Jonathan Lippman
 Panelists: Wisconsin Chief Justice Shirley S. Abrahamson, Utah Chief Justice Christine M. Durham, and Connecticut Chief Justice Chase T. Rogers
 Great Women, Great Chiefs (February 16, 2011)
 Speakers: Massachusetts Chief Justice Margaret H. Marshall, Iowa Chief Justice Marsha K. Ternus, and South Carolina Chief Justice Jean H. Toal

Notable alumni 

 Warren M. Anderson, New York State Senate Majority Leader
 Howard C. Bushman, Jr., Law Clerk to Robert H. Jackson
 Frances E. Cafarell, Clerk of the Appellate Division, Fourth Department
 Anthony V. Cardona, former Presiding Justice of the New York Appellate Division, Third Department
 Jeremy Cooney, New York State Senator 
 Craig J. Doran, Administrative Judge for the Seventh Judicial District
 Domenick L. Gabrielli, Associate Judge, New York Court of Appeals
 Michael J. Garcia, Associate Judge, New York Court of Appeals, former U.S. Attorney for the Southern District of New York
 Megyn Kelly, news anchor, Fox News Channel
 Alicia Ouellette, 18th President and Dean, Albany Law School
 Richard Parsons, Chairman & former CEO of Time Warner
 Stephen P. Younger, 113th President of the New York State Bar Association

References

External links 
 

American law journals
Quarterly journals
Law journals edited by students
Publications established in 1936
English-language journals
Union University
1936 establishments in New York (state)
General law journals